Ecchinswell is a village in the Basingstoke and Deane district of Hampshire, England.

Geography
Watership Down, location of Richard Adams' novel of the same name, is just south of Ecchinswell. Ladle Hill on Great Litchfield Down, also lies to the south.  Part of the hill is a  biological SSSI, first notified in 1978. The hill has a partially completed Iron Age hill fort on its summit, and the surrounding area is rich in Iron Age tumuli, enclosures, lynchets and field systems. Ladle Hill and Watership Down are easily accessed from the Wayfarer's Walk cross-county footpath that passes through the parish.

Governance
The village of Ecchinswell is part of the civil parish of Ecchinswell, Sydmonton and Bishops Green and is part of the Burghclere, Highclere and St Mary Bourne ward of Basingstoke and Deane borough council. The borough council is a Non-metropolitan district of Hampshire County Council.

Literature
Nuthanger Farm at Ecchinswell features extensively in Richard Adams' Watership Down.

Notable people

 The potter, Geoffrey Eastop (1921–2014), lived in the village
 Lord Turner of Ecchinswell, former Chairman of the Financial Services Authority and the Committee on Climate Change, has a cottage in Ecchinswell

References

External links

Ecchinswell.net

Villages in Hampshire